Audubon Place may refer to:

Audubon Place, in Audubon Place Historic District, Tuscaloosa, Alabama
Audubon Place (New Orleans, Louisiana)